Hywel Teifi Edwards (15 October 1934 – 4 January 2010) was a Welsh academic and historian, a prominent Welsh nationalist, a broadcaster and an author in the Welsh language. He was the father of the BBC journalist Huw Edwards.

Early life
Born and raised in Aberarth, Ceredigion, Edwards attended Aberaeron Grammar School and the University College of Wales, Aberystwyth.

Career
Edwards taught Welsh at Garw Grammar School, Pontycymmer, where he met his wife Aerona. Their two children are Huw Edwards and Meinir Edwards (now Meinir Krishnasamy). He subsequently became an extramural lecturer in Welsh literature at University of Wales, Swansea, and later Professor and Head of the Welsh Department.

He retired from full-time teaching in 1995 but continued to lecture and write books. Edwards was the leading authority on the history of the National Eisteddfod of Wales.

Politics
Edwards stood twice for Plaid Cymru as a parliamentary candidate, in Llanelli in 1983 and Carmarthen in 1987. He represented Llangennech on Dyfed County Council for 12 years from 1977, and served for over 30 years as a Plaid Cymru member of Llangennech Community Council.

Works
Yr Eisteddfod 1176–1976, Gomer Press (1976)
Gŵyl Gwalia: Yr Eisteddfod yn Oes Aur Victoria 1858–1868, Gomer Press (1980)
Codi'r hen wlad yn ei hol, 1850–1914, Gomer Press (1989)
Eisteddfod Ffair y Byd, Chicago, 1893, Gomer Press (1990)
Arwr glew erwau'r glo, 1850–1950, Gomer Press (1994)
O'r pentre gwyn i Gwmderi, Gomer Press (2004)
Hanes Eglwys Bryn Seion, Llangennech (2007)
The National Pageant of Wales, Gomer Press (2009)

References

External links
Obituary in The Independent
Obituary in the THES
Obituary in Welsh Icons
Obituary in The Guardian

People from Ceredigion
Plaid Cymru politicians
Welsh-speaking academics
20th-century Welsh historians
Historians of Wales
1934 births
2010 deaths
Alumni of Aberystwyth University
Academics of Swansea University
Welsh nationalists
Members of Dyfed County Council
21st-century Welsh historians